Ivan the Fool or Ivan the Ninny is a lucky fool stock character who appears in Russian folklore, a very simple-minded, but, nevertheless, lucky young man. Ivan is described as a likeable fair-haired and blue-eyed youth.

The approximate setting of Ivan the Fool's adventures is 15th- or 16th-century Russia.

Ivan the Fool usually appears in stories either as a peasant or as the son of a poor family. He is usually the youngest of three brothers; his older siblings appear much smarter than he, but are sometimes unkind to and envious of him.

In contrast to typical heroes, Ivan's simplicity and lack of guile turn out to help him in his adventures. For example, he listens to his heart rather than to his mind, and he easily forgets offence and endeavors to help others even at his own expense. His naivety, kindness, and daring help him fight villains, make friends, and win princesses' hearts, and ultimately he is rewarded with half a kingdom or some similar accomplishment.

The moral of these stories is that Ivan the Fool is rarely the fool, but is merely perceived as such by others owing to his simple nature and joviality. According to one theory, Ivan the Fool as originally created was not intended to be a fool at all: at that time the Russian word дурак (durak, currently meaning "fool") did not have any negative connotation, and was used to refer to the youngest son in the family. It was only later that it obtained a new meaning, from which the ambiguity arose.

It is inevitably the case that he is a positive character in all tales which mention him.

See also
 Blonde joke
 Blonde stereotype
 Ivan Tsarevich
 Jack (hero)
 Ivan the Fool (story)
 Honza

References

Fiction set in the 15th century
Fictional people from the 16th-century
Russian folklore characters
Fairy tale stock characters
Russian folklore
Fictional jesters